Svobodny Ugol is a rural locality (a village) in Novlenskoye Rural Settlement, Vologodsky District, Vologda Oblast, Russia. The population was 8 as of 2002.

Geography 
Svobodny Ugol is located 71 km northwest of Vologda (the district's administrative centre) by road. Panovo is the nearest rural locality.

References 

Rural localities in Vologodsky District